The Volta ao Algarve (Portuguese) is a road bicycle racing stage race held annually in the Algarve, Portugal. Since 2017, it has been organised as a 2.HC event on the UCI Europe Tour. The race became part of the new UCI ProSeries in 2020. Due to its early February position in the European calendar, it is used by many riders to prepare for the Spring Classics.

Winners

Wins per country

External links
  

 
Cycle races in Portugal
Recurring sporting events established in 1960
UCI Europe Tour races
1960 establishments in Portugal
Winter events in Portugal